"I Don't Need a Man" is a song recorded by American girl group the Pussycat Dolls for their debut studio album PCD (2005). It was written and produced by Rich Harrison, with additional writing from Nicole Scherzinger, Vanessa Brown and Kara DioGuardi. A post-disco song, "I Don't Need a Man" promotes female empowerment. The song was released as the fifth single from PCD on September 9, 2006, by A&M Records and Interscope Records.

Upon its release, "I Don't Need a Man" received critical acclaim. A commercial success, it became their fifth consecutive top-ten single on the UK Singles Chart, peaking at number seven, while also attaining top-ten positions in Australia, Belgium, Hungary, Ireland, the Netherlands, New Zealand, Poland, Romania and Scotland. In the United States, it became their lowest-charting single, peaking at number 93 on the Billboard Hot 100 due to its limited release in the country.

Writing and production 
"I Don't Need a Man" was written and produced by Rich Harrison, with additional writing from Nicole Scherzinger, Vanessa "VV" Brown and Kara DioGuardi. Ron Fair provided additional and vocal production for the song. The song was recorded for the group's debut album PCD (2005) and predominately features Scherzinger's vocals with background vocals by VV Brown. Tal Herzberg engineered and used Pro-Tools for the track, as well as playing bass for the production. Horns were led and arranged by Jerry Hey, with further contributions from Garry Grant, Dan Higgins and Bill Reichenbach. Wurlitzer, piano and glockenspiel were played by Fair. Further engineering was carried out by Scotty Beats, JD Andrew, Mike Hogue, and Mike "Angry" Eleopoulos. Peter Mokran mixed "I Don't Need a Man" at the Record Plant studios in Los Angeles.

The song was released alongside its B-side "We Went as Far as We Felt Like Going", which is a medley of Labelle's song "Far as We Felt Like Goin" (1975), written by Bob Crewe and Kenny Nolan, and The S.O.S. Band's song "Take Your Time (Do It Right)" (1980). The Pussycat Dolls' version was produced by Fair with additional production and Pro-Tools by Herzberg. Lead vocals were credited to Scherzinger, whilst Melody Thornton, Carmit Bachar and Kaya Jones were credited with additional vocals. "We Went as Far as We Felt Like Going" first appeared on the soundtrack to the animated film Shark Tale (2004).

Music and lyrics

"I Don't Need a Man" is a post-disco song with a length of three minutes and 39 seconds. According to EMI Music Publishing's digital sheet music for the song, "I Don't Need a Man" is composed in the key of D minor and set in common time, with a moderate groove of 105 beats per minute. The group's vocal range spans from the low note of A3 to the high note of D5.

"I Don't Need a Man" has been described as a song that finds the "self-objectifying group flipping the script" for female empowerment. Caroline Bologna of HuffPost claimed that the song is about masturbation. Stephen Thomas Erlewine likened the song to the music of Beyoncé, while Rebecca Deczynski of Nylon retrospectively wrote that the song was a prequel to her song "Single Ladies (Put a Ring on It)" (2008).

Critical reception 

Rebecca Deczynski of Nylon magazine listed "I Don't Need a Man" in her list of 12 songs that defined girl power, appreciating the "crystal-clear" messaging behind it. People magazine contributors also lauded its themes, deeming it as one of PCD better songs. musicOMH's John Murphy acknowledged its synth production.

Commercial performance 
In comparison with the previous four singles from PCD, "I Don't Need a Man" was slightly less commercially successful. In the United Kingdom, the song debuted at number 21, with first-week digital sales of 5,448 units in the last week of September 2006. The following week, it sold 13,220 copies after its physical release and peaked at number seven, becoming the Pussycat Dolls' fifth consecutive top-ten single as PCD surpassed sales of one million copies in the country. The same week, the song reached the summit of the UK R&B Chart and number eight on the Scottish Singles Chart.

"I Don't Need a Man" was also the group's fifth consecutive top-ten single in multiple countries aside from the UK, peaking at number five in the Netherlands, number six in Australia, number seven in Belgium (Flanders) and New Zealand, and number nine in Ireland. In the United States, it became their lowest-charting song on the Billboard Hot 100, peaking at number 93 due to its limited release in the country.

Music video

The accompanying music video for "I Don't Need a Man" was directed by Chris Applebaum and was first announced and described by group member Ashley Roberts in a blog entry on their official website. It premiered on the group's website on April 17, 2007 and on MTV's TRL the following day, following its international release through the maxi CD single of "I Don't Need a Man" in September 2006.

The first verse begins with Roberts doing her nails dressed in white clothing. The video features Nicole Scherzinger singing, Carmit Bachar drying her hair and Jessica Sutta having a shower as they prepare to go out. In the chorus, the Dolls mimic a hair salon scene. During the second verse, the video shows Kimberly Wyatt in a bath getting ready to go out, Melody Thornton putting on her make-up and Scherzinger singing. In the second chorus, it shows the group performing a dance routine before breaking into different slides of the members dancing separately. Following this, Scherzinger and Thornton are shown singing "let it go", a bridge in the middle of the song. This then breaks into more dance clips of the members, with Scherzinger singing. The video concludes with the group performing another dance routine against a black background in the final chorus before confetti falls down.

Track listings and formats

UK digital download and European CD single
"I Don't Need a Man" 3:40
"We Went as Far as We Felt Like Going" 3:52

International digital EP
"I Don't Need a Man" 3:40
"I Don't Need a Man" (instrumental) 3:29
"We Went as Far as We Felt Like Going" 3:52

Australian and UK maxi CD single
"I Don't Need a Man" 3:40
"I Don't Need a Man" (instrumental) 3:29
"We Went as Far as We Felt Like Going" 3:52
"I Don't Need a Man" (music video) 3:40

US Hit 3 Pack EP
"I Don't Need a Man" 3:40
"Don't Cha" (featuring Busta Rhymes) 4:33
"Buttons" (featuring Snoop Dogg) 3:51

Credits and personnel 

Credits adapted from the liner notes of PCD and Tidal.

Recording
Mixed at The Record Plant (Hollywood, California)

Personnel

JD Andrews engineer
Scotty Beats engineer
Vanessa Brown background vocals, songwriter
Kara DioGuardi songwriter
Mike "Angry" Eleopoulos engineer
Ron Fair incidental additional producer, vocal producer, vocal arranger, glockenspiel, piano, Wurlitzer
Gary Grant horns
Rich Harrison songwriter, producer, track programmer
Tal Herzberg engineer, Pro Tools, bass
Jerry Hey horn arrangement, horns
Dan Higgins horns
Mike Hogue assistant mix engineer
Peter Mokran mix engineer
Bill Reichenbach horns
Nicole Scherzinger songwriter

Charts

Weekly charts

Year-end charts

Certifications

Release history

References

External links

Official website

2005 songs
2006 singles
The Pussycat Dolls songs
A&M Records singles
Interscope Records singles
Songs written by Nicole Scherzinger
Songs written by Kara DioGuardi
Songs written by Rich Harrison
Song recordings produced by Rich Harrison
Song recordings produced by Ron Fair
Music videos directed by Chris Applebaum
Songs with feminist themes
Post-disco songs